This is a list of radio stations in the state of Baja California Sur, which can be sorted by their call signs, frequencies, location, ownership, names, and programming formats.

Notes

References 

Baja California Sur
Baja California Sur